Aram Yuryevich Ayrapetyan (born 22 November 1986) is a professional football goalkeeper who currently plays for Atyrau. Born in Russia, he represents the Armenia national team.

Career

Club
On 13 January 2020, Ayrapetyan left FC Urartu, signing for Iranian team Paykan a couple days later.

Career statistics

International

References

External links
 
 
 

1986 births
Sportspeople from Sochi
Russian people of Armenian descent
Living people
Armenian footballers
Armenia international footballers
Russian footballers
Association football goalkeepers
FC Smena Komsomolsk-na-Amure players
FC Urartu players
FC Ararat Yerevan players
FC Atyrau players
Armenian Premier League players
Expatriate footballers in Iran
Expatriate footballers in Kazakhstan
Kazakhstan Premier League players